The 1st Tambaram City Council is the current meeting of the legislative branch of the Tambaram City Municipal Corporation in Chennai, Tamil Nadu, India, composed of the 70 Councillors elected from 70 wards across five zones.

The 2022 Tamil Nadu urban local body elections decided the control of the council. The Secular Progressive Alliance consisting of Dravida Munnetra Kazhagam and Indian National Congress won 53 seats. All India Anna Dravida Munnetra Kazhagam became the second largest party by winning 9 seats. Independents won the other 8 seats.

Party Summary

Leadership 

The Mayor is the head of the municipal corporation, but the role is largely ceremonial as executive powers are vested in the Corporation Commissioner. The office of the Mayor combines a functional role of chairing the Corporation meeting as well as a ceremonial role associated with being the First Citizen of the city. Deputy Mayor is appointed by the Mayor for a five-year term.

Mayor 
K. Vasanthakumari, DMK

Deputy Mayor 
G. Kamaraj, DMK

Members 
The list of Councillors elected from 70 wards across the five Zones of Tambaram City are listed below:

Infrastructure

Waste Management

Garbage 
As a first step to achieving 100% source segregation of waste collected from households, the Tambaram Corporation has taken 15 wards out of 70 as model wards and is conducting face-to-face interactions with the people. As part of the initiative, the councillors in these 15 wards have been meeting people regularly while waste is collected in the morning and creating awareness about source segregation. The details of the vehicle collecting waste, its timings and contact number of the drivers are placed on every street. The sanitary workers are allowed to take waste that can be sold at the scarp shops to encourage them to work better. The Corporation distributes manure for free to the residents who provide segregated waste. The waste segregation has increased to 75% from 40% in these wards. The corporation plans to implement this in all the wards.

The corporation has 27 micro composting centres in total and the wet waste collected is transferred to a micro composting centre in Thiru Vi Ka Nagar. Biodegradable wastes are processed into manure. The recyclable waste is segregated and transferred to a recycling plant in Anakaputhur, where the same is sold to the vendor. In the last few months, the city has produced around 970 tonnes of natural manure. About 133 tonnes of manure were given free of cost to the residents and 598 tonnes of manure were sold.

Sewage 
Sewage, collected from households where the underground drainage (UGD) system is unavailable, is dumped into the natural waterbodies of the city. The Southern Bench of the National Green Tribunal has directed the Tambaram Municipal Corporation to take steps to implement the underground drainage scheme in the uncovered areas on a war footing to avoid discharge of untreated sewage.

Following the NGT order, the Corporation proposed a faecal sludge treatment facility at ₹13 lakh in the Tambaram Sewage Treatment Plant. The sewage collection lorries would be allowed to dump the sewage at the plant for a minimum fee. The proposal includes fixing the global positioning system (GPS) equipment in these lorries and tracking their movement to ensure these lorries dump the sewage only in the authorised Sewage Treatment Plant.

The corporation has submitted a proposal for biomining of waste below the Pallavaram Periya Eri bed at a cost of ₹5 crore unde the Swachch Bharat Mission. The corporation also has plans to take up biomining of the garbage dump in Madambakkam and Perungalathur at a cost of ₹3 crore under the same scheme.

References 

Government of Chennai
2022 in Indian politics